The 2019 Israeli Beach Soccer League was a national beach soccer league event that took place between 14 June and 26 July 2019, in Netanya, Israel.

Schedule of matches was published on the official Facebook page of Israeli Beach Soccer League.

Group stage

All kickoff times are of local time in Netanya, Israel (UTC+02:00).

Group A

Group B

Relegation playoffs (Loser on Final is relegated)

Relegation playoffs

Knockout stage

Exhibition match

Details

Quarter-finals

Semi-finals

Youth Final

Awards

Survival match

Exhibition match

Final

Goalscorers
Players who scored at least 7 goals

11 goals

  Lucao (Maccabi "RE/MAX" Netanya)
  Bruno Xavier (Bnei "Falfala" Kfar Qassem)

10 goals
  Filipe da Silva (Bnei "Falfala" Kfar Qassem)

9 goals

  Alon Levi (Maccabi "RE/MAX" Netanya)
  Miguel Jr. (Hapoel "Yilmazlar" Holon)
  Bar Shem Tov (Beitar "Tofes Yashir" Jerusalem)

8 goals

  Amer Yatim (Bnei "Falfala" Kfar Qassem)
  Elihay Tzabari (Maccabi "RE/MAX" Netanya)
  Edson (Hapoel "Sarfati Shimon" Ashkelon)
  Reyder (Hapoel "Avaz HaZahav" Be'er Sheva)

7 goals

  Michael Kirtava (Hapoel "Confino" Hedera)
  Nicolas Bella (Hapoel "Yilmazlar" Holon)
  Paulinho (Ironi Rosh HaAyin)
  Kobi Badash (Beitar "Milk" Ma'ale Adumim)

Winners

Awards

See also
 Israeli Beach Soccer League

References

Israeli Beach Soccer League seasons
National beach soccer leagues
2019 in beach soccer